Events in the year 1780 in Norway.

Incumbents
Monarch: Christian VII

Events
August - Denmark-Norway joins the First League of Armed Neutrality.

Arts and literature
 Det Dramatiske Selskab in Oslo is founded.

Births

30 January – Christian Garup Meidell, military officer and politician (died 1863)
25 August – Conradine Birgitte Dunker, socialite and writer (died 1866)
9 November – Nicolai Wergeland, priest, writer and politician (died 1848).

Full date unknown
Jens Aars, priest and politician (died 1834)
Hans Eleonardus Møller, Sr., businessperson (died 1860)

Deaths

21 April – Carl Deichman, businessman, mine operator, book collector and philanthropist (born c.1705).
5 December – Jens Boalth, educator (born 1725).

Full date unknown
Anders Porsanger, Sami linguist and priest (born 1735)
Martin Nürenbach, theatre director

See also

References